Vice-Admiral Ronald Douglas Buck CMM, CD is a retired officer of the Canadian Forces. He was Chief of the Maritime Staff from 21 June 2001 to 25 August 2004.

Career
Buck joined the Royal Canadian Navy in 1967. He became Commanding Officer of the destroyer  in 1987, Project Manager for the Maritime Coastal Defence Vessel Project in 1989 and Commander Fifth Canadian Destroyer Squadron in 1992. He went on to be Commander Canadian Forces Training System in 1994, Chief of Staff of the Management Command and Control Reengineering Team at the National Defence Headquarters in 1995 and Commander Canadian Fleet Pacific in 1997. After that he was appointed Chief of the Maritime Staff in 2001 (during which he took part in Operation Apollo – the anti-terrorism initiative – in 2001) and Vice Chief of the Defence Staff in 2004 before retiring in 2006.

Awards and decorations
Buck's personal awards and decorations include the following:

110px

100px

100px

References

|-

Living people
Royal Canadian Navy officers
Commanders of the Order of Military Merit (Canada)
Canadian admirals
Military personnel from Montreal
Vice Chiefs of the Defence Staff (Canada)
Year of birth missing (living people)
Commanders of the Royal Canadian Navy